Chay Seqerlu (also Romanized as Chāy Seqerlū; also known as Chāy Segherlū) is a village in Rezaqoli-ye Qeshlaq Rural District, in the Central District of Nir County, Ardabil Province, Iran. At the 2006 census, its population was 150, in 39 families.

References 

Towns and villages in Nir County